La Voz de Asturias is a newspaper in Spain.  Published in Oviedo, it serves Asturias. It was founded in 1923 by José Tartiere Lenegre. Until 2012 it was a printed newspaper, after which it ceased publication. Four years later, in 2016, in reemerged as an online newspaper. It has a progressive political stance. Mostly written in Spanish, it also contains a section in Asturian called "Agora" (agora means now in Asturian).

See also
 List of newspapers in Spain

References

External links
  La Voz de Asturias official website

1923 establishments in Spain
Newspapers published in Spain
Publications established in 1923
Spanish-language newspapers
Asturian-language newspapers